Pogost is a rural locality (a village) in Khavrogorskoye Rural Settlement of Kholmogorsky District, Arkhangelsk Oblast, Russia. The population was 7 as of 2010.

Geography 
It is located on the Pingisha River.

References 

Rural localities in Kholmogorsky District